The 9th annual Billboard Latin Music Awards, which honor the most popular albums, songs, and performers in Latin music, took place May 9 in Miami. Winners are determined by the actual sales and radio airplay data that informs Billboards weekly charts, including Top Latin Albums, and radio charts, including Hot Latin Tracks, during a one-year period from the issue dated Feb. 17, 2001 through the Feb. 9, 2002, issue.

Hot Latin Songs of the Year

Hot Latin Track of the Year
Juan Gabriel — "Abrázame Muy Fuerte"
 Marco Antonio Solís — "O Me Voy O Te Vas"
 Jaci Velasquez — "Como Se Cura Una Herida"
 Palomo — "No Me Conoces Aun"

Hot Latin Track of the Year, Vocal Duo
Nydia featuring Juan Gabriel — "No Vale la Pena"
 Ramón Ayala and Jody Farias — "La Calandria"
 Julio Iglesias and Alejandro Fernández — "Dos Corazones, Dos Historias"
 La Ley featuring Ely Guerra — "El Duelo"

Hot Latin Tracks Artist of the Year
Cristian Castro
 Juan Gabriel
 Banda El Recodo
 Marco Antonio Solís

People

Songwriter of the Year
Juan Gabriel
 Marco Antonio Solís
 Omar Alfanno
 Estefano

Producer of the Year
Bebu Silvetti
 Alejandro Jaén
 Pepe Aguilar
 Jesus Guillen

Pop Album of the Year, Male
Luis Miguel — Mis Romances
 Marco Antonio Solís — Más de Mi Alma
 Cristian Castro — Azul
 Alejandro Fernández — Origenes

Pop album of the year, female
"Mi Corazon", Jaci Velasquez (Sony Discos)
"Live, The Last Concert-Houston, Texas Feb. 26, 1995", Selena (EMI Latin)
"Entre Tangos Y Mariachi", Rocío Dúrcal (BMG Latin)
"Huelo A Soledad", Ana Gabriel (Sony Discos)

Pop album of the year, group
"Shhh!", A. B. Quintanilla Y Los Kumbia Kings (EMI Latin)
"Somos Gitanos", Gipsy Kings (Nonesuch)
"Siempre En Mi Mente", Los Tri-O (BMG Latin)
"Embrace the Chaos", Ozomatli (Interscope)

Pop album of the year, new artist
"Proxima Estacio..Esperanza", Manu Chao (Virgin)
"Alexandre Pires", Alexandre Pires (BMG Latin)
"Pachanga", King Africa (Fonovisa)
"Si Se", Si Se (Luaka Bop/Virgin)

Latin pop airplay track of the year
"Abrázame Muy Fuerte", Juan Gabriel (BMG Latin)
"Como Se Cura Una Herida", Jaci Velasquez (Sony Discos)
"Azul", Cristian (BMG Latin)
"Suerte", Shakira (Sony Discos)

Top Latin albums artist of the year
Marc Anthony (Sony Discos)
A.B. Quintanilla Y Los Kumbia Kings (EMI Latin)
Vicente Fernández (Sony Discos)
Lupillo Rivera (Sony Discos)

Latin rock album of the year
"Proxima Estacion...Esperanza", Manu Chao (Virgin)
"Embrace The Chaos", Ozomatli (Interscope)
"Cuando La Sangre Galopa", Jaguares (BMG Latin)
"MTV Unplugged", La Ley (Warner Latina)

Tropical/salsa album of the year, male
"Libre", Marc Anthony (Sony Discos)
"Dejame Entrar", Carlos Vives (EMI Latin)
"Instinto Y Deseo", Víctor Manuelle (Sony Discos)
"Intenso", Gilberto Santa Rosa (Sony Discos)

Tropical/salsa album of the year, female
"Yo Por Ti", Olga Tañón (Warner Latina)
"8", Gisselle (BMG Latin)
"Corazon De Mujer", Melina León (Sony Discos)
"La Negra Tiene Tumbao", Celia Cruz (Sony Discos)

Tropical/salsa album of the year, group
"Coleccion Romantica", Juan Luis Guerra 440 (Karen/Universal Latino)
"Mania 2050", Grupomania (Universal Latino)
"Calle Sabor, Esquina Amor", Limi-t 21 (EMI Latin)
"Americanizao", Fulanito (Cutting)

Tropical/salsa album of the year, new artist
"Yo Si Me Enamore", Huey Dunbar (Sony Discos)
"Multiplicame", Fuerza Juvenil (Mas Music)
"Tortilla Party", El Vacilon De La Manana (J&N)
"Joseph Fonseca", Joseph Fonseca (Karen/Universal Latino)

Tropical/salsa airplay track of the year
"Me Da Lo Mismo", Víctor Manuelle (Sony Discos)
"Pero No Me Ama", Gilberto Santa Rosa (Sony Discos)
"Me Libere", El Gran Combo (Combo)
"Pueden Decir", Gilberto Santa Rosa (Sony Discos)

Regional Mexican album of the year, male
"Despreciado", Lupillo Rivera (Sony Discos)"En Vivo:Desde La Plaza El Progreso De Guadalajara", Joan Sebastian (Balboa)
"Sufriendo A Solas", Lupillo Rivera (Sony Discos)
"Lo Mejor De Nosotros", Pepe Aguilar (Balboa)

Regional Mexican album of the year, male group"Ansia De Amar", Conjunto Primavera (Fonovisa)"Contigo Por Siempre...", Banda El Recodo (Fonovisa)
"Uniendo Fronteras", Los Tigres del Norte (Fonovisa)
"En Vivo..El Hombre Y Su Musica", Ramon Ayala Y Sus Bravos Del Norte (Freddie)

Regional Mexican album of the year, female group or female solo artist"Soy Lo Prohibido", Alicia Villarreal (Universal Latino)"Con Sabor A Mexico", Las Jilguerras (Fonovisa)
"Para Las Madrecitas", Sparx Y Lorenzo Antonio (Fonovisa)

Regional Mexican album of the year, new artist"Despreciado", Lupillo Rivera (Sony Discos)"Sufriendo A Solas", Lupillo Rivera (Sony Discos)
"Fuerza Musical", Palomo (Disa)
"Homenaje A Chalino Sánchez", Jessie Morales:El Original De La Sierra (Univision)

Regional Mexican airplay track of the year"Y Llegaste Tu", Banda El Recodo (Fonovisa)"No Me Conoces Aun", Palomo (Disa)
"No Te Podias Quedar", Conjunto Primavera (Fonovisa)
"Despreciado", Lupillo Rivera (Sony Discos)

Latin greatest hits album of the year"Historia De Un Idolo Vol. 1", Vicente Fernández (Sony Discos)"Historia Musical Romantica", Grupo Bryndis (Disa)
"La Historia", Ricky Martin (Sony Discos)
"Historia Musical", Los Angeles Azules (Disa)

Latin compilation album of the year"No. 1: Un Ano De Exitos", Various Artists (Sony Discos/Warner Latina)"Bachatahits 2001", Various Artists (J&N/Sony Discos)
"Billboard Latin Music Awards 2001", Various Artists (BMG Latin)
"Merenhits 2001", Various Artists (J&N/Sony Discos)

Latin jazz album of the yearLatin Spirits, Poncho Sanchez (Concord Picante)Calle 54, Soundtrack (Blue Note/Capitol)
Volume 3-New Congo Square, Los Hombres Calientes (Basin Street)
Supernova, Gonzalo Rubalcaba (Blue Note/Capitol)

Latin dance club play track of the year"Heroe (Remixes)", Enrique Iglesias (Interscope)"Play (Remixes)", Jennifer Lopez (Epic)
"Guitarra G", Banda Sonora (Tommy Boy)
"Out Of Nowhere", Gloria Estefan (Epic)

Latin dance maxi-single of the year"Love Don't Cost A Thing [Amor Se Paga Con Amor]", Jennifer Lopez (Epic)"I'm Real (Remixes)", Jennifer Lopez (Epic)
"Loaded", Ricky Martin (Sony Discos)
"Out of Nowhere", Gloria Estefan (Epic)

Latin rap album of the year"El General Is Back", El General (Mock & Roll/Lideres)"De Nuevos A Viejos", Wisin & Yandel (BM/Aponte)
"Vivo", Vico-C (EMI Latin)
"Mundo Frio", Lito & Polaco (Pina)

Publisher of the year
(Songs that charted during the tracking period.) WB, ASCAPVander, ASCAP
Edimonsa, ASCAP
BMG Songs, ASCAP

Publishing corporation of the yearWarner/Chappell Music'''
Sony/ATV Music
EMI Music
BMG Music

Special awards
Spirit Of Hope-Ricky Martin
Lifetime Achievement Award-Puerto Rico's El Gran Combo
Star Award-Ana Gabriel
Viewer's Choice Award-Thalía

References

Billboard Latin Music Awards
Latin Billboard Music Awards
Latin Billboard Music Awards
Billboard Music Awards
Latin Billboard Music